Nancy Anne Atterton ( Fogarty; born 17 May 1934) is a former Australian sprinter. During the 1954 British Empire and Commonwealth Games in Vancouver, she won a gold medal in the 4 × 110 yards relay, and also competed in the 100 yards and 220 yards events.

Fogarty was born in New South Wales. After retiring from competing, she became involved in coaching sprinters such as Miles Murphy and Josh Clarke.

References

1934 births
Living people
20th-century Australian women
21st-century Australian women
21st-century Australian people
Athletes (track and field) at the 1954 British Empire and Commonwealth Games
Australian female sprinters
Commonwealth Games gold medallists for Australia
Sportswomen from New South Wales
Commonwealth Games medallists in athletics
Medallists at the 1954 British Empire and Commonwealth Games